Ove Thorsheim (born 30 May 1949) is a Norwegian diplomat.

Thorsheim holds a cand.philol.

Thorsheim began for the Norwegian Ministry of Foreign Affairs in 1979. He was the Norwegian ambassador to Australia from 2000 to 2005 and South Africa from 2005 to 2007. After a period serving as deputy under-secretary of state in the Ministry of Foreign Affairs from 2007 to 2011, Thorsheim was appointed as ambassador to Portugal in 2011.

References

1949 births
Living people
Ambassadors of Norway to Australia
Ambassadors of Norway to New Zealand
Ambassadors of Norway to Portugal
Ambassadors of Norway to South Africa
Norwegian civil servants
Norwegian diplomats
Norwegian expatriates in South Africa